Norway competed at the 2016 Winter Youth Olympics as the host nation in Lillehammer, Norway from 12 to 21 February 2016.

Medalists

Medalists in mixed NOCs events

Alpine skiing

Boys

Girls

Parallel mixed team

Biathlon

Boys

Girls

Mixed

Bobsleigh

Cross-country skiing

Boys

Girls

Curling

Mixed team

Team
Andreas Hårstad
Michael Mellemseter
Eline Mjøen
Maia Ramsfjell

Round Robin

Draw 1

Draw 2

Draw 3

Draw 4

Draw 5

Draw 6

Draw 7

Quarterfinals

Mixed doubles

Figure skating

Singles

Freestyle skiing

Halfpipe

Ski cross

Slopestyle

Ice hockey

Boys' tournament

Roster

 Erik Beier Jensen
 Jens Bjornslett
 Sondre Bolling Vaaler
 Truls Brathen
 Pontus Finstad
 Kristian Hovik
 Sander Hurrod
 Markus Mikkelsen
 Fredrik Pedersen
 Mathias Emilio Pettersen
 Kalle Rode
 Lars Rodne
 Theo Rooseboom De Vries
 Oliver Skramo
 Alexander Thomas
 Kristoffer Thomassen
 Christian Wetteland

Group Stage

Girls' tournament

Roster

 Ingrid Berge
 Marthe Brunvold
 Nora Christophersen
 Mabel Endrerud
 Karen Forgaard
 Hedda Havarstein
 Mia Isdahl
 Karen Jensen
 Thea Jorgensen
 Stine Kjellesvik
 Maren Knudsen
 Kaja Kristensen
 Malin Kristensen
 Ena Marie Nystrom
 Emilie Olsen
 Kamilla Olsen
 Millie Sirum

Group Stage

Luge

Nordic combined 

Individual

Nordic mixed team

Skeleton

Ski jumping 

Individual

Team

Short track speed skating

Boys

Girls

Mixed team relay

Qualification Legend: FA=Final A (medal); FB=Final B (non-medal); FC=Final C (non-medal); FD=Final D (non-medal); SA/B=Semifinals A/B; SC/D=Semifinals C/D; ADV=Advanced to Next Round; PEN=Penalized

Snowboarding

Halfpipe

Snowboard cross

Slopestyle

Speed skating

Boys

Girls

Mixed team sprint

See also
Norway at the 2016 Summer Olympics

References

2016 in Norwegian sport
Nations at the 2016 Winter Youth Olympics
Norway at the Youth Olympics